This is a list of some of the rivers which flow through the two districts of Dakshina Kannada and Udupi. The names of river vary depending upon area where they flow. Almost all rivers of these districts flow westward and join Arabian sea.

Netravati 
Netravati river has its origins in the western ghats of Karnataka state in India. River Sumaradhara, Neryare, Manihalla and Gurupura river join to River Netravati. Some of the places  on the banks of this river are Mangalore, Bantwal, Uppinangadi, Dharmasthala and Ullal. It joins the Arabian sea at Mangalore. River Netravati is known as Dakshina Kannada Jeeva Nadi. Its length is 103 km. It having an area of approximately 1352 sq miles. It is main source water transport, fishing, power generation and also for drinking purposes .

Kumaradhara 
Kumaradhara River originates in the western ghats and joins Netravati river. Kukke Subramanya is on the banks of Kumaradhara.

Gurupur or Phalguni 
Gurupur river flows through Gurupur, Mangalore, Tannirubhavi. It joins the Netravati River near Bengre .

Nandini or Pavanje 
Nandini or Pavanje river joins the Arabian sea near Sashihitlu and Koluvail. It Originates in kanakagiris (Iruvail) and flows through Kateel, Attur-Kemral and Pavanje.

Shambhavi 
Shambhavi River flows through Mulki town.

Pangala 
This river touches the village of Pangala and joins the Arabian sea near Matti.

Paapanaashini 
Paapanaashini river, also commonly known as Udyavara river joins Arabian sea near Malpe. Udyavara, Shirva-Manchakal and Malpe are some of the places through which this river flows.

Swarna or Suvarna 
The Swarna river (Tudhe in Tulu ) flows through villages Perdoor, Hiriyadka, Parika (parkala) Herga, Manipal, Perampalli, Uppoor and Kallianpur, Many Kudrus (small Island) like Moodukudru, Baligera Kudru, Padukudru etc. It is the main source of drinking water to Udupi District. It joins the Arabian Sea at Bengre.

Sita or Seetha 
The river originates in Western Ghats near Hebri at the top of Narasimha parvatha. This river mostly flows through Udipi taluk. The famous town Barkur is on the banks of river Sita. It converges with Suvarna river before joining Arabian sea.

Panchagangavalli River
Panchagangavalli River is a river flowing through Kundapur and Gangolli in western India. The five rivers namely Souparnika River, Varahi River, Kedaka River, Chakra River, and Kubja River will join and merge into Arabian sea.

Sowparnika or Souparnika River 
The places on the banks of this river are Kollur and Marvanthe. It comes near Arabian Sea in Maravanthe where there is a small strip of land between the sea and river. It flows inwards the land for some 7 kilometers more to reach the Sea from this point and joins the Arabian sea at Gangolli. It is well connected with the origin of the famous Kollur Mookambika Temple.

Varahi River 
Varahi River, also called Halady River, flows through Western Ghats in the Indian state of Karnataka. It joins the sea via Halady, Basrur, Kundapur and Gungulli. According to mythology, Varaha is one of the incarnations of Lord Vishnu. Varahi is consort of Varaha.

Chakra  
Chakra river has its origin in Western ghats and touches Hemmadi before joining Arabian sea.

 
Karnataka districts, Dakshina Kannada and Udupi, List of rivers
Rivers
Rivers
rivers of Dakshina Kannada and Udupi